Centre of Sports in Jonava is an indoor sporting center in Jonava, Lithuania. It holds a boxing base, a pool, a table tennis base, a gym and a main ground. The sporting center also holds basketball and volleyball competitions.

In 2014, the Centre hosted the playoffs for the Baltic Women's Volleyball League.

The Jonava indoor arena will be replaced with the Jonava Arena (planned to open 2014–2016, capacity: 3,000).

References

External links
Official site

Basketball venues in Lithuania
Sports venues in Jonava